Akil Blount (born July 2, 1994) is an American football linebacker who is a free agent. He was signed by the Miami Dolphins as an undrafted free agent in 2016 and played college football at Florida A&M.

Professional career

Miami Dolphins
Blount was signed by the Miami Dolphins as an undrafted free agent following the 2016 NFL Draft. On August 27, 2016, Blount was waived by the Dolphins.

Pittsburgh Steelers
On February 14, 2017, Blount was signed by the Pittsburgh Steelers. He was released by the Steelers on May 17, 2017.

Orlando Apollos
Blount signed with the Orlando Apollos of the Alliance of American Football for the 2019 season.

Personal life
Blount is the son of Hall of Fame cornerback Mel Blount. He is also the father of Akilah Blount.

References

External links
Florida A&M Rattlers bio

1994 births
Living people
Players of American football from Pittsburgh
American football linebackers
Florida A&M Rattlers football players
Miami Dolphins players
Pittsburgh Steelers players
Orlando Apollos players